The 1990–91 Iran 2nd Division football season was played in four groups of ten teams each.

Standings

Group A

Group B

Group C

Group D

References

League 2 (Iran) seasons
Iran
2